Hudson Hawk is a 1991 American action comedy film directed by Michael Lehmann. Bruce Willis stars in the title role and also co-wrote both the story and the theme song. Danny Aiello, Andie MacDowell, James Coburn, David Caruso, Lorraine Toussaint, Frank Stallone, Sandra Bernhard and Richard E. Grant are also featured.

The live action film employs cartoon-style slapstick heavily, including sound effects, which enhances the film's signature surreal humor. The plot combines material based on conspiracy theories, secret societies, and historic mysteries, as well as outlandish "clockpunk" technology à la Coburn's Our Man Flint films of the 1960s.

A recurring plot device in the film has Hudson and his partner Tommy "Five-Tone" (Aiello) singing songs concurrently but separately, to time and synchronize their exploits. Willis-Aiello duets of Bing Crosby's "Swinging on a Star" and Paul Anka's "Side by Side" are featured on the film's soundtrack.

The film was a huge critical failure in the United States, only grossing $17 million and earning three Razzies (including Worst Picture), but it was better received internationally and grossed $80 million for a worldwide total of $97 million.

Plot
Eddie Hawkins—"Hudson Hawk" (from the bracing winds off the Hudson)—is a master cat burglar and safe-cracker with a penchant for using low-tech solutions against high-tech security systems and for conducting his robberies with precise, synchronized timing (later revealed to be a robust catalog of memorized music that he and his partner(s) sing along with during jobs). Upon his release and his first day of parole, he and his former partner, Tommy "Five-Tone" Messina, seek out a good cup of cappuccino; however, before he gets it, he is blackmailed by various entities, including his parole officer, the minor Mario Brothers Mafia family, and the CIA, into doing a few art heists. Hawk refuses each except with mounting pressure and coercion, stating that his only real desires are to remain out of prison and enjoy a good cup of cappuccino -- though he is repeatedly interrupted before doing so. Hawk eventually relents and proceeds to case the art pieces.

Unbeknownst to Hawk, his blackmailers are all being manipulated by the American corporation, Mayflower Industries, run by husband-and-wife Darwin and Minerva Mayflower and their butler, Alfred. Headquartered in the Esposizione Universale Roma, the company seeks to take over the world by reconstructing La Macchina dell'Oro, a machine invented by Leonardo da Vinci that converts lead into gold. An assembly of crystals needed for the machine to function are hidden in a variety of Leonardo's artworks: the maquette of the Sforza, the Da Vinci Codex, and a scale model of da Vinci's helicopter. Sister Anna Baragli is an operative for a secret Vatican counter-espionage agency, working with the CIA to assist in Hawk's mission in Rome, though intending to foil the robbery at St. Peter's.

After blowing up an auctioneer to cover up the theft of the Sforza, the Mario Bros. take Hawk away in an ambulance. He sticks syringes into Antony Mario's face, falls out of the ambulance on a gurney, and they try to run him down with the ambulance as they speed along the highway. The brothers are killed when their ambulance crashes. Immediately afterwards, Hawk meets CIA head George Kaplan and candy-bar themed codenamed agents—Snickers, Kit Kat, Almond Joy, and Butterfinger—who take him to the Mayflowers.

Hawk successfully steals the Da Vinci Codex from another museum, but later refuses to steal the helicopter design. Tommy Five-Tone fakes his death so they can escape. They are discovered and attacked by the CIA agents; Kaplan reveals that he and his agents stole the piece, and unlike them, had no problem killing the guards. Hawk and Tommy escape when Snickers and Almond Joy are killed, and pursue the remaining agents. Kit Kat and Butterfinger take Anna to the castle where the Macchina dell'Oro is being reconstructed.

The showdown is in the castle between the remaining CIA agents, the Mayflowers, and the team of Hudson, Five-Tone, and Baragli. Kit Kat and Butterfinger are killed by Minerva, although Kit Kat frees Baragli before dying. Tommy fights Darwin and Alfred inside the speeding limo, and Hudson fights George Kaplan on the roof of the castle. Kaplan topples from the castle, landing on the limo. Alfred plants a bomb in it, escaping with Darwin; Tommy is trapped inside while Kaplan is hanging onto the hood. The bomb detonates as the limo speeds over a cliff.

Darwin and Minerva force Hawk to put together the crystal powering the machine, but he intentionally leaves out one small piece. When the machine is activated, it malfunctions and explodes, killing the Mayflowers. Hawk battles Alfred, using his own blades to decapitate him. Hawk and Baragli escape the castle, using the da Vinci flying machine, discovering Tommy waiting for them at a cafe, having miraculously escaped death through a combination of airbags and a sprinkler system in the limo. With the world saved and da Vinci's secrets protected, Hawk finally gets to enjoy a cappuccino.

Cast

Soundtrack

The soundtrack album was released by Varèse Sarabande in 1991. There are eleven tracks in all. The film's score (represented by tracks 4-9) was composed and conducted by Michael Kamen with Robert Kraft. Kraft also wrote "Hawk Swing" and co-wrote the film's theme with star Bruce Willis.

 "Hudson Hawk Theme" - Dr. John (05:38)
 "Swinging on a Star" - Bruce Willis and Danny Aiello (02:53) - Sung in incorrect order of verses (the plot device in the movie refers to the original track length as 5:32)
 "Side by Side" - Bruce Willis and Danny Aiello (02:18) (the plot device in the film refers to the original track length as 6:00)
 "Leonardo" (04:55)
 "Welcome to Rome" (01:46)
 "Stealing the Codex" (01:58)
 "Igg and Ook" (02:22)
 "Cartoon Fight" (02:54)
 "The Gold Room" (05:57)
 "Hawk Swing" (03:41)
 "Hudson Hawk Theme" (instrumental) (05:18)

The song "The Power" by Snap! is featured, although not included on the soundtrack, when Hudson Hawk is taken for the first time to the headquarters of the Mayflowers. Minerva Mayflower, played by Sandra Bernhard, is sitting on a desk and sings the song while it plays on her headphones.

Reception
On Rotten Tomatoes, the film has a rating of 31% based on 45 reviews, with an average rating of 4.6 out of 10. The site's critics consensus: "Hudson Hawk'''s kitchen-sink approach to its blend of action and slapstick results in a surreal, baffling misfire." On Metacritic, the film has a weighted average score of 17 out of 100, based on 15 critics, indicating "overwhelming dislike". Audiences polled by CinemaScore gave the film an average grade of "C+" on an A+ to F scale.

In the Chicago Tribune, Terry Clifford observed that: "The end result is being thrown up on selected screens this weekend, and the suspicion that this was a pooch turns out to be undeniably correct. Boring and banal, overwrought and undercooked, Hudson Hawk is beyond bad."

As Kenneth Turan wrote in the Los Angeles Times:

Roger Ebert and Gene Siskel gave the film a "two thumbs down" review on their At the Movies TV show. Ebert described the film as a complete disaster: "every line starts from zero and gets nowhere". Siskel's review was marginally more positive saying that Willis had a few funny moments and furthermore that the film might have been salvaged if Willis and Aiello had been the only zany characters against a cast of straight men as opposed to a cast full of overacting where everyone tried too hard to make each line funny.Variety called the film "a relentlessly annoying clay duck that crash-lands in a sea of wretched excess and silliness. Those willing to check their brains at the door may find sparse amusement." Peter Travers of Rolling Stone said of the film, "A movie this unspeakably awful can make an audience a little crazy. You want to throw things, yell at the actors, beg them to stop." James Brundage of AMC filmcritic said the film was "so implausible and so over the top that it lets inconsistency roll off like water on a duck's back." Janet Maslin in the New York Times called the film "a colossally sour and ill-conceived misfire" and denounced the film for "smirky, mean-spirited cynicism." Writing in The Washington Post, Joe Brown said, "To say this megamillion Bruce Willis vehicle doesn't fly is understatement in the extreme... Hudson Hawk offers a klutzy, charmless hero, and wallows dully in limp slapstick and lowest common denominator crudeness." Chris Hicks wrote in the Salt Lake City Deseret News, "What is most amazing is the pervasive silliness that has the cast acting like fools without ever getting a laugh from the audience. It's hard to imagine a major, big-budget movie that could come along this year and be worse than Hudson Hawk, a solid contender for the longest 95 minutes in movie history. Owen Gleiberman in Entertainment Weekly called the film "a fiasco sealed with a smirk."

Jo Berry from Empire gave it three out of five stars noting that it "reached UK screens with the added burden of having been slaughtered by US critics who likened it to famous big budget turkeys like Raise The Titanic and Ishtar. True, the film has its flaws, but the positives do outweigh the negatives, with Bruce Willis at his wisecracking best in the title role."

Jane Lamacraft reassessed the film as one of the "Forgotten Pleasures of the Multiplex" for Sight & Sound's June 2011 magazine.

In his autobiography, With Nails, Richard E. Grant diarises the production of the film in detail, noting the ad hoc nature of the production and extensive rewriting and replotting during the actual filming. Willis went on to become one of the leading box-office stars of the 1990s, but has not made any further forays into scriptwriting.

Box office
The film performed poorly in the United States, partly because the film was intended as an absurd comedy, yet was marketed as an action film one year after the success of Die Hard 2. It grossed only $17 million in the United States and Canada. Internationally it performed much better, grossing $80 million for a worldwide total of $97 million. By the end of its theatrical run, the film had lost the studio an estimated $90 million.

The film performed well on home video and by 1995 started to pay out to profit participants, including Bruce Willis.

Accolades
It received three 1991 Golden Raspberry Awards for Director (Lehmann), Screenplay and Picture with additional nominations for Actor (Willis), Supporting Actor (Grant) and Supporting Actress (Bernhard). It was also nominated for Worst Picture at the 1991 Stinkers Bad Movie Awards.

Home media
The film was released on VHS in late 1991. Upon its home video release, the tagline "Catch the Excitement, Catch the Adventure, Catch the Hawk" was changed to "Catch the Adventure, Catch The Laughter, Catch the Hawk". Despite the film's failure at the US box office, the film was successful on home video.

It was released twice on DVD, first in 1999 and again in 2007 with new extras. In 2013, Mill Creek Entertainment released Hudson Hawk on Blu-ray for the first time; it was included in a set with Hollywood Homicide. All extras were dropped for the latter release.

Video game
A video game based on the film was released in 1991 under the title Hudson Hawk'' for various home computers and game consoles. Sony Imagesoft released versions of the game for the NES and Game Boy, while Ocean Software released it for the Commodore 64, Amiga, ZX Spectrum, Amstrad CPC, and Atari ST. It is a side-scrolling game where the player, as the Hawk, must steal the Sforza and the Codex from the auction house and the Vatican, respectively. Then Castle Da Vinci has to be infiltrated in order to steal the mirrored crystal needed to power the gold machine. On his journey, Hawk must face many oddball adversaries, including dachshunds that try to throw him off the roof of the auction house, janitors, photographers, killer nuns, and a tennis player (presumably Darwin Mayflower).

References

External links
 
 
 

 

1991 films
1991 action comedy films
1990s crime comedy films
American action comedy films
American crime comedy films
American heist films
1990s English-language films
Films directed by Michael Lehmann
Films produced by Joel Silver
Films set in Italy
Films shot in Budapest
Films shot in Hungary
Silver Pictures films
TriStar Pictures films
Films set in Vatican City
Films scored by Michael Kamen
Films with screenplays by Steven E. de Souza
Golden Raspberry Award winning films
Films with screenplays by Daniel Waters (screenwriter)
1990s American films